Madeleine Madden (born 29 January 1997) is an Australian actress. She is best known for playing Egwene al'Vere in the Amazon Prime series The Wheel of Time.

Early life
Madden grew up around Redfern, a Sydney inner city suburb, and attended Rose Bay Secondary College. The daughter of Lee Madden (Gadigal and Bundjalung) and art curator and writer Hetti Perkins, Madden grew up in a political family; she is the great-granddaughter of Arrernte elder Hetty Perkins and the granddaughter of activist and soccer player Charles Perkins. Her aunt is director Rachel Perkins. She has two older sisters and two younger half-sisters, including actor Miah Madden. Their father died in a car accident in 2003.

Career
In 2010, at age 13, Madden became the first teenager in Australia to deliver an address to the nation, when she delivered a two-minute speech on the future of Indigenous Australians. It was broadcast to 6 million viewers on every free-to-air television network in Australia.

Television
Madden starred in Australia's first Aboriginal teen drama, Ready for This, and in the critically applauded Redfern Now. She has also starred in The Moodys, Jack Irish, My Place and The Code. In 2016, she starred in the mini series Tomorrow, When the War Began which is based on the John Marsden series of young adult books. In 2018, she played Marion Quade in the mini series Picnic at Hanging Rock, Crystal Swan in the TV mini series Mystery Road and Immy DuPain in the series Pine Gap. She currently stars as Egwene al'Vere in Amazon's adaptation of The Wheel of Time novels.

Film
Madden has starred in short films by Deborah Mailman, and Meryl Tankard and co-starred with Christina Ricci and Jack Thompson in Around the Block. Her first film acting job was at 8 years old. She aims to become a director in the future.

In 2019, Madden made her big Hollywood debut as Sammy in the Nickelodeon film Dora and the Lost City of Gold.

Filmography

Film

TV

Video Games

References

External links
 

Living people
Place of birth missing (living people)
1997 births
21st-century Australian actors
Australian film actors
Australian people of German descent
Australian indigenous rights activists
Australian people of Irish descent
Australian television actors
Indigenous Australian actors
Women human rights activists
Australian women curators